Calvin Miller (born 9 January 1998) is a Scottish footballer who last played as a left-back or winger for Scottish Championship side Greenock Morton. Miller previously played in Scotland for Celtic, Dundee and Ayr United on loan, and in England for Harrogate Town, Notts County (on loan) and Chesterfield.

Club career

Celtic
Having attended training sessions at Rangers, Miller signed for Celtic in 2010, aged 12.

In addition to domestic tournaments (he was in the squad which won the Scottish Youth Cup in 2015, and started and scored in the competition's 2017 final), Miller featured in several international youth tournaments during his Celtic youth career such as the NextGen Series and the UEFA Youth League. In May 2016 he was named in a matchday squad for the first time and also signed a new contract running until 2019. Earlier that year he had been marked by the Scottish press as one of the 'three to watch' from the youth team.

Miller made his league and competitive debut against Partick Thistle on 20 December 2016. He received praise for his performance in the match, which Celtic won. It was at this point that his manager Brendan Rodgers revealed that Miller, who had previously been considered a winger or forward in his youth career with the club, was retraining in a more defensive position. Rodgers also expressed his hope that Miller could flourish in his new role in a similar manner to his previous trainee Ryan Bertrand.

He did not feature for the senior team again until 8 August 2017, when he played the full 90 minutes in a 5–0 win over Kilmarnock in the Scottish League Cup, with regular left-back Kieran Tierney filling in as a central defender.

Miller started at left-back on 19 August 2017 in the Scottish Premiership, again against Kilmarnock, and was given man of the match by Sky Sports. His side won 2–0 with goals from James Forrest and Callum McGregor. He was selected in further home fixtures against St Johnstone in February 2018 and Kilmarnock again in May, being replaced in the second half by Tierney in both matches, which ended in 0–0 draws after Celtic made several other changes which appeared to affect their rhythm as a unit.

Miller signed a new contract with Celtic in August 2018, tying him to the club until summer 2020 with the possibility of extension. Speaking on his future, he stated that his short-term aim was to secure a loan move to gain further experience.

Dundee loan
On 31 August 2018, Miller moved to fellow Premiership club Dundee on loan. He made his debut from the bench on 1 September in a 3–1 home defeat to Motherwell. On 23 October, he missed an opportunity to score his first senior goal when he sent a penalty kick wide of the post in an eventual 3–0 defeat to Heart of Midlothian. On 18 December he did score, netting Dundee's consolation goal in a 5–1 loss away to Aberdeen. His loan, intended originally to be for the full season, was curtailed at the end of December 2018.

Ayr United loan
On 31 January 2019, Miller joined Scottish Championship club Ayr United on loan until the end of the 2018–19 season.

Return, injury and release
Having returned to Celtic in summer 2019 Miller spoke of his hope of being in the plans of Neil Lennon, Celtic's new manager who had used Miller in friendly matches in his previous spell in charge of the club. However, when Kieran Tierney was sold in August 2019, Miller was overlooked at left back for a UEFA Champions League qualifier against CFR Cluj, the position instead being taken by midfielder Callum McGregor – who put in an uncertain performance as Celtic lost at home and were eliminated from the competition. Miller then turned down a move to Kilmarnock as part of a deal to bring Greg Taylor (also a left back) to Celtic, a signing which, along with improvement in the form of Boli Bolingoli, another new signing in the same position, further diminished the chances of Miller being selected. The slight prospect then disappeared entirely after Miller was injured in a reserve match on 17 September, requiring surgery the following week which would rule him out until the end of the season (and the end of his Celtic contract) with no opportunity to impress the manager within the club or out on loan. His departure was confirmed in May 2020.

Harrogate Town
English club Harrogate Town signed Miller on 3 October 2020.

Notts County loan
On 11 January 2021, Miller joined National League side Notts County on loan for the remainder of the 2020-21 season.

Chesterfield
On 25 June 2021, Miller agreed to return to the National League to join Chesterfield upon the expiration of his contract with Harrogate. On 13 October 2022, Miller had his contract terminated by mutual consent.

Greenock Morton 
On 2 January 2023, Miller signed with Scottish Championship side Greenock Morton until the end of the season.

International career
Miller has been selected for Scotland at various youth levels. He made his debut for the under-21 team in March 2019.

Personal life
Miller was born in Glasgow and grew up in the city's Castlemilk district. He is the father of one daughter, Olivia, born in 2015.

Career statistics

References

External links

Living people
1998 births
Scottish footballers
Footballers from Glasgow
Celtic F.C. players
Dundee F.C. players
Ayr United F.C. players
Harrogate Town A.F.C. players
Notts County F.C. players
Chesterfield F.C. players
Scottish Professional Football League players
English Football League players
National League (English football) players
Association football fullbacks
Association football wingers
Scotland youth international footballers
Scotland under-21 international footballers
Greenock Morton F.C. players